Mark Stetson (born 1952) is a visual effects artist.

He has worked on over 60 films since his start in 1979.

He won at the 74th Academy Awards in the category of Best Visual Effects for his work on the film The Lord of the Rings: The Fellowship of the Ring. He shared his Oscar with Randall William Cook, Jim Rygiel, and Richard Taylor.

He was also nominated at the 57th Academy Awards and the 79th Academy Awards.

References

External links

https://web.archive.org/web/20140717031946/http://www.visualeffectssociety.com/bod/mark-stetson

Living people
1952 births
Best Visual Effects Academy Award winners
Best Visual Effects BAFTA Award winners
Special effects people
Place of birth missing (living people)